The Whidden Lectures are a lecture series at McMaster University, founded in 1954 by E. Carey Fox. They commemorate Howard P. Whidden, who was Chancellor of the university from 1923 to 1941. They were first given in 1956. Many of the lectures have been published in book form, by Oxford University Press.

1956 C. W. de Kiewiet: The Anatomy of South African Misery
1957 Vijaya Lakshmi Nehru: The Evolution of India
1958 Ronald Syme: Colonial Elites: Rome, Spain and the Americas
1959 Charles De Koninck: The Hollow Universe
1960 George Norman Clark: Three Aspects of Stuart England
1961 William Foxwell Albright:.New Horizons in Biblical Research
1962 J. Robert Oppenheimer: The Flying Trapeze: Three crises for physicists
1963 Ian Ramsey: Models and Mystery
1964 David Daiches, The Paradox of Scottish Culture: the Eighteenth Century Experience
1965 William Arthur Lewis: Politics in West Africa
1966 Anthony Blunt: Picasso's 'Guernica'
1967 Northrop Frye: The Modern Century
1970 Eric Ashby:  Masters and Scholars;: Reflections on the rights and responsibilities of students  
1973 Edward Togo Salmon: The Nemesis of Empire
1974 Richard Stockton MacNeish
1975 Noam Chomsky: Reflections on Language
1983 A. J. Ayer: Freedom and Morality
1986 John Rupert Martin
1988 Tom Stoppard: The Event and the Text
1993 Alan James Ryan
1997 Elizabeth Loftus
2000 Bruce Meyer: Canadian Literature and the Western Tradition
2001 Steven V. W. Beckwith Physics and Astronomy, Johns Hopkins University, "Rocket Science and Little Green Men"
2002 Cancelled
2003 Jean-Daniel Stanley Deltas Global Change Program, Smithsonian, National Museum of Natural History, Washington, DC, "World Deltas: Archeological and Environmental Perspectives"
2005 Donna Haraway Professor of the History of Consciousness, University of California, Santa Cruz, "We Have Never Been Modern"
2006 Brian Massumi Professor of Communication, Université de Montréal, "The Ideal Streak—Why Visual Representation Always Fails," "Potential Politics and the Primacy of Preemption," and "Affect and Abstraction"
2007 Mervyn Morris Poet and Professor Emeritus of Creative Writing and West Indian Literature, University of the West Indies, "Playing with the Dialect of the Tribe: West Indian Poetry"
2008 Mahmood Mamdani Professor of Government in the Departments of Anthropology and Political Science at Columbia University, "Darfur, Politics, and the War on Terror"
2009 Sean B. Carroll Professor of Molecular Biology and Genetics, University of Wisconsin, "Remarkable Creatures: Epic Adventures in the Search for the Origin of Species" and "Endless Forms Most Beautiful: Evo-Devo and an Expanding Evolutionary Synthesis"
2011 Sara Ahmed Professor of Media and Communications, Goldsmiths, University of London, "On Being Included: On Racism and Diversity in Institutional Life" and "Wilful Subjects: On the Experience of Social Dissent"
2012 Ray Jayawardhana Professor and Canada Research Chair in Observational Astrophysics, University of Toronto. "Rocks, Ice and Penguins: Searching for Clues to Planetary Origins in Antarctica"
2013 Jasbir Puar Department of Women's and Gender Studies, Rutgers University. "Ecologies of Sensation,Sensational Ecologies: Sex and Disability in the Israeli Occupation of Palestine"
2014 Joanna Aizenberg Amy Smith Berylson Professor of Materials Science in the School of Engineering and Applied Science and Professor of Chemistry and Chemical Biology, Harvard University."Stealing from Nature: Bioinspired Materials of the Future"
2016 Amber Miller Professor of Physics and Dean of Science at Columbia University. "Nature's Ultimate Time Machine: Photographing the Infant Universe", "Cosmological Observations from the Stratosphere"
2017 Daphne Brooks Professor of African American Studies, Theater Studies, and American Studies at Yale University. "The Knowles Sisters' Political Hour: Black Feminist Sonic Dissent at the End of the Third Reconstruction", "If You Should Lose Me": The Archive, the Critic, the Record Shop & the Blues Woman"
2018 Joanna Bryson Associate Professor in the Department of Computing at the University of Bath. "The Good, the Bad, and the Synthetic"

Notes
Whidden Lecture Home Page

Lecture series
McMaster University